Malva pudding is a sweet pudding of South African origin. It contains apricot jam and has a spongy caramelised texture. A cream sauce is always poured over it while it is hot, and it is usually served warm with custard and/or ice-cream.  Many South African restaurants offer it. The pudding is thought to originally be of Dutch then Cape Dutch origin synonymous with the Cape. 

The pudding gained popularity on the West Coast of the US after Oprah Winfrey's personal chef, Art Smith, served it for Christmas dinner in 2006 to the pupils of the Oprah Winfrey Leadership Academy for Girls in South Africa.

There are various theories on the origin of the name.

The Oxford English Dictionary says it comes from Afrikaans , meaning "marshmallow" (ultimately from Latin , a mallow).  This may arise from a resemblance between the pudding's texture and that of a marshmallow or a similar Afrikaner sweet, the malvelekker, made with the extract of marsh mallow.
Malva is also Afrikaans for geranium (in the broad sense, including Pelargonium).  Another botanical theory is that the batter was originally flavoured with the leaves of the lemon- or the rose-scented geranium, varieties of South African native plants.
Art Smith said that according to Colin Cowie, his hospitality ambassador in South Africa, the pudding was named after a woman called Malva.
 Another theory is that the sauce originally contained Malvasia (malmsey) wine.  Proponents of this theory include brandy or sherry in the sauce.
 Still others suggest that the pudding was originally accompanied by Malvasia wine.

Jan Ellis Pudding is a variant.

Cape brandy pudding 
Cape brandy pudding is a closely related dish to, possibly a variant of, Malva pudding. The main difference being the substitution of some Malva ingredients with Cape brandy and dates for sweetness.

See also

 List of African dishes

References

South African cuisine
Puddings